Hylopetes is a genus of flying squirrels. There are about 10 species.

Species include:
Particolored flying squirrel - H. alboniger (Hodgson, 1836)
Bartel's flying squirrel - H. bartelsi Chasen, 1939
Hainan flying squirrel - H. electilis (Allen, 1925)
Palawan flying squirrel - H. nigripes (Thomas, 1893)
Indochinese flying squirrel - H. phayrei (Blyth, 1859)
Jentink's flying squirrel - H. platyurus (Jentink, 1890)
Arrow flying squirrel - H. sagitta (Linnaeus, 1766)
Sipora flying squirrel - H. sipora Chasen, 1940
Red-cheeked flying squirrel - H. spadiceus (Blyth, 1847)
Sumatran flying squirrel - H. winstoni (Sody, 1949)

References

 
Rodent genera
Taxa named by Oldfield Thomas